Susan Holmes may refer to:

 Susan Holmes (born 1972), American model
 Susan Holmes (fabric artist) (born 1941), New Zealand fabric artist
 Susan Holmes (politician) (born 1942), American politician
 Susan Carter Holmes (born 1933), English botanist
 Susan P. Holmes, statistician